Menegazzia terebrata is a species of foliose lichen found scattered across many continents, including North America, South America, Europe, Africa, and Asia.

Taxonomy 
This species was first described as Lobaria terebrata by Georg Franz Hoffmann in 1796. In 1854, Italian lichenologist Abramo Bartolommeo Massalongo renamed it Menegazzia terebrata.

Description 
Menegazzia terebrata has a glossy blue-grey  and a black, wrinkled undersurface. This species does not have any rhizines on the undersurface. The medulla is white. Asci contain eight single-celled ascospores, like most species of Ascomycota. The spores are amyloid positive. The outside edges are different shades of brown. This species is distinguished by small holes in the upper thallus. Apothecia are rarely seen on this species so they mostly reproduce asexually. The lobes of this lichen are rounded and almost tube-like, with soredia on the lobe tips. The holes in its upper surface give the lichen many of its common names, including treeflute lichen, honeycomb lichen, and keyhole lichen. A potassium hydroxide test will produce K+ yellow results on the surface and medulla of this lichen.

Habitat and distribution 
Menegazzia terebrata grows on acidic substrates, including trees and rock. It prefers acidic species of tree, including Alder, Beech, and Northern white cedar. It also prefers to grow on more acidic siliceous and siliciferous rock. It is most common in northern wet-mesic forests. It can be an indicator of an old growth forest. This species sometimes grows with moss, and often the moss grows between the lobes of lichen. It is often found growing on coastlines near the ocean. Menegazzia terebrata was found to be an indicator species of clean air in Western Oregon and Washington.

Ecology 
The algae in this lichen are chlorococcoid.

Chemistry 
Menegazzia terebrata produces a number of secondary metabolites. The  contains atranorin. The medullar layer contains menegazziaic acid, stictic acid and constictic acid. Menegazzia terebrata and another species of lichen in the Menegazzia family were the first two species where menegazziaic acid were found, so it was named after them. Meneggazziaic acid is a 3-hydroxylated 3-deformylstitic acid.

See also
 List of Menegazzia species

References

External links
Menegazzia terebrata gallery at the Stridvall's Botanical Site
Menegazzia terebrata gallery at Sharnoff Photography

terebrata
Lichen species
Lichens described in 1796
Taxa named by Georg Franz Hoffmann